
Year 753 (DCCLIII) was a common year starting on Monday (link will display the full calendar) of the Julian calendar. The denomination 753 for this year has been used since the early medieval period, when the Anno Domini calendar era became the prevalent method in Europe for naming years.

Events 
 By place 

 Europe 
 Grifo, Frankish duke and illegitimate son of Charles Martel, rebels against King Pepin III ("the Short") (his half-brother), in alliance with the Bretons. He flees to Italy to join King Aistulf of the Lombards, but is caught and killed while passing the Alps.
 The town of Staraja Ladoga (Northern Russia) is founded by Scandinavians. The settlement becomes a prosperous trading outpost for jewelry, casual items, craft tools and dress adornments (approximate date).

 Sevar, ruler (khagan) of the Bulgarian Empire, dies after a 15-year reign. He is succeeded by Kormisosh, who belongs to the Vokil clan (approximate date).

 By topic 

 Religion 
 Fall – Pope Stephen II travels to the Lombard capital of Pavia, for negotiations with Aistulf. His terms for returning the Exarchate of Ravenna are declined.
 November – Stephen II crosses the passes of the Alps to Gaul. He leaves Rome unprotected, under threat of a siege from the Lombards. 
 Eoban is appointed bishop of Utrecht (modern Netherlands), by the missionary bishop Boniface.

Births 
 Xue Ping, general of the Tang Dynasty (approximate date)

Deaths 
 August 8 – Hildegar, bishop of Cologne
 November 3 – Pirmin, Visigothic abbot (b. ), founder of many monasteries in the historical region of Alemannia
 Grifo, Frankish duke and son of Charles Martel (b. 726)
 Herlindis of Maaseik, Frankish abbess (or 745)
 Li Linfu, chancellor of the Tang Dynasty
 Sevar, ruler (khagan) of the Bulgarian Empire (approximate date)

References